Amy Rose Lawton (born 19 January 2002) is an Australian field hockey player.

Personal life
Amy Lawton was born in Worthing, England before relocating to Emerald, Victoria at the age of 7 with her parents and younger sister.

She began playing hockey at nine years of age for her local club Casey, before moving to Cheltenham-based Southern United Hockey Club two years later. As well as hockey, Lawton also plays soccer and competes in triathlons, and has made representative teams for Victoria in all three sports.

Lawton is a current scholarship holder at the Victorian Institute of Sport.

Career

Junior national teams

Under 18
In 2018, Lawton made her debut for the Australian Under 18 team at the Oceania Youth Olympic Games Qualifier in Port Moresby, Papua New Guinea. The team won gold, qualifying for 2018 Youth Olympic Games in Buenos Aires, Argentina.

At the Youth Olympic Games, Lawton again represented the Under 18 side. At the tournament, the team finished fifth.

Under 21
Following her debut for the Under 18 side Lawton debuted for the Jillaroos, the Australian Under 21 side, in November of the same year. She scored a double in her first game for the team during a three match test series against New Zealand in Hastings, New Zealand.

Senior national team
In 2019, Lawton was selected to make her debut for the Hockeyroos during the FIH Pro League. She made her official debut on 25 April 2019 against New Zealand, where the team came away with a 5–1 win. Following her debut in the Pro League, Lawton was called into the team for the 2019 Olympic Test Event held in Tokyo, Japan, where the Australia finished third. At the tournament she scored her first international goal.

On 27 August 2019, Lawton was named in the squad for the third time to represent the team at her first Oceania Cup.

Following her breakout year in 2019, Lawton was named in the Hockeyroos Squad for 2020, officially raising her from the National Development Squad. Lawton represented Australia in the 2020 Tokyo Olympics. She was part of the Hockeyroos Olympics squad. The Hockeyroos lost 1-0 to India in the quarterfinals and therefore were not in medal contention.

International goals

Recognition

AIS Awards
Following her 2019 debut for the Hockeyroos, Lawton was presented with the Emerging Athlete of the Year award at the Australian Institute of Sport Awards night.

References

External links
 
 
 

2002 births
Living people
Australian female field hockey players
People from Cardinia
Field hockey players at the 2018 Summer Youth Olympics
Field hockey players at the 2020 Summer Olympics
Field hockey players at the 2022 Commonwealth Games
Olympic field hockey players of Australia
21st-century Australian women
Commonwealth Games silver medallists for Australia
Commonwealth Games medallists in field hockey
Sportspeople from Worthing
English emigrants to Australia
Field hockey players from Melbourne
Sportswomen from Victoria (Australia)
Medallists at the 2022 Commonwealth Games